Gazi Alimuddin Mannan (also known as GA Mannan;  – 1 March 1990) was a Bangladeshi dancer and choreographer.

Early life and career
Mannan got his dance training in Bombay under Shantibardhan.  In Bombay, he adopted the stage name Manish Kumar. He returned to Dhaka in the 1950s and joined Bulbul Lalitakala Academy in Dhaka and created some dances including peacock dance, spring dance, fishermen's dance, harvest dance, Santal dance and tea-garden dance. Later he established a new forum called Nikkon Lalitkala Academy. He also worked as the dance director of the Bangladesh Performing Arts Academy and Bangladesh Shilpakala Academy.

Zeenat Barkatullah was one of Mannan's students.

References

1930 births
1990 deaths
People from Comilla District
Bangladeshi male dancers